Jamie McDonald (born 19 August 1986) is a British adventurer, author, motivational speaker who lives in Gloucester, and his best known for doing worldly adventures dressed up as his alter-ego, Adventureman.

Career

McDonald has delivered motivational, entertaining and inspiring talks for schools, businesses, charities, and after dinner events all around the world. Whilst sharing his adventures and hardships, he focuses on finding more motivation, never giving up, and helping people to discover more within themselves to make a difference in the world. He has spoken at some of the biggest corporations in the world, including Microsoft, Google and received acclaim from notable people including Sir Steve Redgrave, Sir Geoff Hurst, Dame Kelly Holmes, Sir Ranulph Fiennes and Prince Harry.

Author 
In 2017, McDonald released a book called, Adventureman: Anyone Can Be a Superhero, about his historic 5,000-mile run across Canada, that quickly became a best-seller on Amazon.

Adventureman suit 
Whilst McDonald does his adventures, he always dresses up in his alter-ego custom made costume, Adventureman - which was designed by 10-year-old Conner Reddy who suffers with dyspraxia.

Cycling Bangkok to Gloucester 

In 2012, McDonald bought a second hand bike and decided to cycle the 14,000 miles from Bangkok to his hometown Gloucester, passing through dozens of countries. Along the way he was shot at, arrested and slept rough. He documented his journey in a series of YouTube clips.

Static cycle world record 
Two days after he finished the journey back from Bangkok, McDonald made the decision to attempt the world static cycling record, which stood at 224 hours and 24 minutes. It was a challenge he had conceived whilst cycling from Bangkok. He stepped off the exercise bike set up within a marquee in Gloucester after pedalling for a Guinness world record breaking 268 hours – more than eleven days.

Solo run across Canada 
McDonald set off on 9 March 2013 from St John's, Newfoundland and Labrador, on the Atlantic coast and completed the journey of 5,000 miles to Vancouver on the Pacific on 3 February 2014. McDonald spoke to schools and businesses throughout the entire journey to help with fundraising. His original intention had been to complete the journey before the winter.

McDonald was inspired by Terry Fox, one-legged and suffering from cancer, whose run across Canada was cut short by cancer.

On the route, McDonald faced a number of ordeals: he endured −40C temperatures, he was beaten and robbed celebrating the new year in Banff, Alberta, and had to push his  load in a pushchair when he was no longer able to carry it on his back. Suffering from acute tendinitis in his foot, he continued his run and a bone spur has grown over the inflammation. He slept rough on the side of the road unless taken in by strangers. He wore through 10 pairs of trainers.

He raised more than $500,000 (£250,000) for children's charities in the UK and Canada in a bid to give back to the charities that supported him as an unwell child.

Solo run across America 

McDonald started his run on 10 April 2018 on the West Coast at Cape Alava, in Washington's Clallam County, and completed his 5,500-mile (or 210 marathon) run a year later on the East Coast in Gloucester, Massachusetts before his year long visa ran out.

During the adventure, he fought through desolate +50C deserts, was caught in a terrifying flood in Junction, Texas, been mistaken for a Mexican drug runner, dodged striking snakes, scorpions, spiders, even a mountain lion and was ordered to come out of his tent "with his hands first" by a police officer with his hand on his holster.

Throughout McDonald raised money for U.S children's hospitals and sick children in the U.K and raised nearly $200,000 (£175,000).

Treadmill world record 
Just weeks later, McDonald then broke another endurance world record, running the most miles humanly possible to this point in time; a record-breaking distance of 524 miles. McDonald spent 7 days on a treadmill, sleeping less than 3 hours of sleep a night.

McDonald spent more than 20 hours a day running, covering more than 3 marathons a day - a total of 20 marathons back-to-back. During the challenge, he broke through both physical and emotional barriers, finally reaching 'the beyond', having bouts of naturally formed hallucinations and chemicals being produced around his body, surprisingly giving him power to continue on.

Superhero Foundation 
McDonald co-founded Superhero Foundation, a charity aiming to "empower real-life Superheroes to change, and save lives".

In the UK, the charity supports individuals raising money for treatment not provided by the NHS, as well as supporting children's hospitals.

The charity began by helping Gloucestershire-based father James Bottger raise money to help his wheel-chair bound daughter for an operation in the US to enable her to walk for the rest of her life. Bottger climbed up and down Robinswood Hill in Gloucester, UK, 75 times, until he 'reached the equivalent of Mount Everest', raising tens of thousands of pounds in the process.

Since, the charity has helped other families in similar situations.

Personal life
McDonald was born in Gloucester, England to Donald and Ann McDonald. As a child, McDonald battled an immune deficiency, epilepsy, and syringomyelia and was frequently hospitalised up to the age of nine. As an adult McDonald lives in Gloucester with his partner Anna McNuff, who also is an adventurer, best-selling author and motivational speaker.

Honours and awards

In December 2012, McDonald achieved a World Record for 'Marathon Static Cycling' - stepping off the bike at 268 hours (more than 12 days).

In 2013, during his run across Canada, in Calgary, he was Awarded the White Hat (in previous years the likes of Prince William, Kate Middleton, Arnold Schwarzenegger and many more have also been White Hatted).

Voted 'Male Runner Of The Year' and awarded the 'Golden Shoe' from Canadian Running magazine.

After the run across Canada, on his homecoming in Gloucester, McDonald was presented with the Medal of the City of Gloucester - the highest accolade the Mayor of Gloucester can bestow.

In September 2014 McDonald was named Pride of Britain's 'Fundraiser of the Year' for the West.

He was named in the Independent's 'Happy List 2014', a list of 100 people giving back to the community.

Ambassador of the Year at the Believe in Gloucester Awards 2014.

National Adventure Award Winner for 'Fundraiser of the Year' in 2014.

Honorary Fellowship from the University of Gloucestershire in 2015.

Pride of Britain winner for 'Fundraiser of the Year' - 2019.

References

External links

1986 births
Living people
People educated at St Peter's High School, Gloucester
Place of birth missing (living people)
Sportspeople from Gloucestershire
English male long-distance runners
English motivational speakers